Chang'an Ford 2017 Chinese FA Super Cup (Chinese: 长安福特2017中国足球协会超级杯) was the 15th Chinese FA Super Cup, an annual football match contested by the winners of the previous season's Chinese Super League and FA Cup competitions. The match was played at Chongqing Olympic Sports Center on 25 February 2017, and contested by league and cup double winners Guangzhou Evergrande Taobao and league runners-up Jiangsu Suning. Guangzhou Evergrande won the match 1–0 with a goal from Alan Carvalho. It was Guangzhou Evergrande's third outright victory in the Chinese FA Super Cup, drawing level with Dalian Shide and Shanghai Shenhua.

Match

Details

References

External links
 

FA Super Cup
2017
Guangzhou F.C. matches
Jiangsu F.C. matches